Rayevka is a rural locality (a village) in Starotuymazinsky Selsoviet, Tuymazinsky District, Bashkortostan, Russia. The population was 101 as of 2010. There are 3 streets.

Geography 
Rayevka is located 10 km southwest of Tuymazy (the district's administrative centre) by road. Kyzyl-Bulyak is the nearest rural locality.

References 

Rural localities in Tuymazinsky District